The Zürich S-Bahn system is a network of rail lines that has been incrementally expanded to cover the ZVV area, which comprises the entire canton of Zürich and portions of neighbouring cantons (Aargau, Glarus, Schaffhausen, Schwyz, St. Gallen, Thurgau and Zug), with a few lines extending into or crossing the territory of southern Germany. The network is one of many commuter rail operations in German speaking countries to be described as an S-Bahn.

The entire ZVV S-Bahn network went into operation in May 1990, although many of the lines were already in operation.

Unusual among rapid transit services, the Zürich S-Bahn provides first class commuter travel; about a quarter of seats on each train are first class.

History
Before the construction of the Zürich S-Bahn, most trains to Zürich terminated at Zürich Hauptbahnhof (literally Zürich Main Station), apart from the Sihltal Zürich Uetliberg Bahn lines which terminated at Zürich Selnau. Originally built as a west-facing terminus, the Hauptbahnhof acted as a terminus for trains coming from all directions. It was connected to lines to the north and northeast via the Wipkingen Tunnel and Zürich Oerlikon railway station. The Hauptbahnhof was also connected via the Letten Tunnel to the Lake Zürich right-bank railway line to the southeast. This line also stopped at Stadelhofen station at the opposite side of the city centre, before passing through the single track tunnel to Letten station, then turning 180 degrees to reach the Hauptbahnhof. This line travelled 5 km to cover the 1.5 km distance between Stadelhofen and the Hauptbahnhof.

Gold Coast Express 
The first step in developing Zürich's rail system which eventually led to the establishment of the S-Bahn was the establishment of the so-called Gold Coast Express (German: Goldküstenexpress) on 26 May 1968 between Zürich Stadelhofen and Rapperswil via Meilen along the wealthy north shore of Lake Zürich, popularly known as the Gold Coast. This development came about because, after World War II, there was a rapid expansion of commuting to Zürich from the former wine-growing villages along the railway line, which originally opened in 1894. As a result, commuters complained that the trains were overcrowded, slow and often delayed.

The canton of Zürich began to develop a project to improve the railway in the 1950s. Because it was not used by either long-distance passenger or freight trains, improvements in local services were possible. Double track sections were built between Kuesnacht and Herrliberg and between Stäfa and Uerikon, along with new stations. The main problem was finance. Development of the line would only serve local interests and would not lead to increased revenue for Swiss Federal Railways (SFR). At the time the canton and cities affected could not fund improvements to an SFR line, so the law was changed to allow local contributions.

The new Gold Coast Express service operated a regular schedule every half-hour, with the total journey time for the distance of  reduced from the previous 60 to 40 minutes. The most striking feature of the improved railway was the three-car claret-coloured RABDe 12/12 electric multiple units. These had good acceleration and braking performance and immediately became known as "Mirages", after the jet fighters. The modern features of the Mirages included automatically closing doors, which allowed short stops at stations and a reduction in travel time.

U-Bahn rejection 

On 30 May 1959 some voters put two proposals to the Zürich City Council. The first would have allocated CHF 200,000 for a study on the construction of a two-line U-bahn (underground railway) with lines from Enge to Kloten and from Altstetten to Tiefenbrunnen; but it was opposed by the majority of the City Council and failed. The second motion proposed the establishment of a company to build and operate a Zürich U-Bahn. The city had already considered such a proposal and opposed it, on the basis that Zürich was not big enough for an underground railway, and it would cost too much. In a referendum on 14 February 1960, 69.8% of voters voted "no" to the proposal.

Following further work and the enactment of a new transport act, the regional public transport authorities presented a new proposal for a combined regional U-Bahn and S-Bahn system, with the latter being a railway network centred on a tunnel under the city centre, which would connect to existing suburban railway lines. From Zurich Airport, an U-Bahn line would run via Glattbrugg, Oerlikon, Hirschenwiesen, Central, Zürich Hauptbahnhof, Stauffacher and Altstetten to Dietikon. Much of the line would have run above ground. The second part of the proposal was the "Zürichberg network", a line from Zürich Hauptbahnhof via a new tunnel under the Zürichberg to Dietlikon to the northeast (not to be confused with Dietikon, which lies to the west of Zürich). The proposed construction of an underground station in Museumstrasse on the north side of the Hauptbahnhof was intended to ease the pressure on the Hauptbahnhof. On 20 May 1973 this proposal was rejected in a referendum, with the "no" vote as high as in the previous referendum. At the referendum, little opposition had been expressed against the proposed S-Bahn lines.

Coordination and construction of the S-Bahn

Rail is a major element in Zürich's public transport system, and its upgrade required close collaboration between the canton of Zürich and Swiss Federal Railways (SBB CFF FFS), the owner of most of the railways. The SBB CFF FFS had insufficient resources for a substantial upgrade of commuter services. On the other hand, the canton of Zürich could not fund an alternative transport network.

The first step towards cooperation came in 1978 with the establishment of a Transport Fund providing CHF 40 million annually for urban transport. The routes of today's S-Bahn were established in a debate in the cantonal Council on 19 June 1978. Alternative "eastern" and "western" options were discussed. Under the western option the northern end of the central tunnel from the Hauptbahnhof would have connected with Oerlikon, while in the eastern option it would have tunneled under the Zürichberg and ended near Dietlikon. The cantonal Council chose the eastern option by 85 votes to 36.

At a referendum on 29 November 1981, Zürich's voters approved by a two-thirds majority a loan of CHF 520 million for the construction of the core of the S-Bahn. The following changes were made:
The construction of the Hirschengraben tunnel between the Hauptbahnhof and Stadelhofen. Four new platforms were built under the existing Hauptbahnhof, along with connections to the existing western lines. The Letten Tunnel and station were closed.
The construction of the Zürichberg Tunnel, which connected Stadelhofen to lines to the northeast, as well as having a new station at Stettbach.
The extension of the Sihltal Zürich Uetliberg Bahn lines from Selnau to the Hauptbahnhof, with the Selnau terminus closed and replaced with an underground through station.
The opening of Hardbrücke railway station in 1982, between the Hauptbahnhof and Altstetten to the west.
The redevelopment of Stadelhofen station, with an architecture award-winning design by Santiago Calatrava.

Opening and expansion
On 27 May 1990, the S-Bahn was brought into operation and the Zürcher Verkehrsverbund (Zurich Transport Network) began operations. For the first time, one could travel on trains, buses and trams with just one ticket. Despite "teething problems", passenger numbers increased rapidly. Since the opening of the S-Bahn, travel volumes have increased by about 60%. In several stages, S-Bahn services were expanded to a  rail network, and peak hour express trains were added.

The first stage of the expansion addressed the chronic overcrowding of trains on the S12 route between Dietikon and Zürich, requiring improvements in the Limmat valley. The widening of the railway to four tracks between Dietikon and Killwangen allowed the separation of the S-Bahn from the long-distance and freight services. The new S3 service introduced as a result complemented the S12 service, to provide a train every 15 minutes on the route. At the same time the sections of the S9 route via Knonau were upgraded to allow services to be increased to each half hour. Services on the north side of Lake Zürich were increased with trains provided every 15 minutes by S6, S7 and S16 services. A new station was opened at Glanzberg between Dietikon and Schlieren.

Under the second stage of expansion in December 2002, night trains were added to the S-Bahn. Since 2007, night trains provide a continuous 24-hour service from Friday morning until Sunday evening on some lines.

The third stage expansion was completed in 2007. On 12 December 2004 (coinciding with the completion of the first stage of Rail 2000), the S3 service was extended from Dietikon through the Heitersberg Tunnel to Aarau with a new station at Mellingen. On 10 December 2006, S15 was opened between Rapperswil and Birmensdorf following line improvements. It was extended from Birmensdorf to Affoltern am Albis on 9 December 2007. South of Zürich sections of the Sihltalbahn were doubled. On the rural feeder lines around Winterthur (S33 to Schaffhausen, S35 to Wil and S41 to Bülach) services were increased to run every half hour. The S8 was extended from Winterthur to Weinfelden, providing with the existing S30 services two trains an hour on the line. In addition, the S16 was extended every hour to Schaffhausen, stopping after Winterthur only at Andelfingen and Neuhausen am Rheinfall. Moreover, on the line from Winterthur to Wil a new station opened at Winterthur Hegi.

Opening of the Weinberg Tunnel 
 
Following a successful referendum, a project was established to create a new route between the Hauptbahnhof and Oerlikon station. Unlike the existing two routes between the stations, the Weinberg tunnel would approach the Hauptbahnhof from the east, allowing trains to run between the western and northern lines without bypassing the central station. This route was known as Durchmesserlinie Zürich, and was for use of both long-distance and S-Bahn trains. The project also included a third set of underground platforms under Zürich Hauptbahnhof, a new elevated route through the western approaches and two extra platforms at Oerlikon.

Breakthrough of the new Weinberg Tunnel was achieved in November 2010, and it was opened to traffic on the 14 June 2014. On the same date, the new platforms, also known as the Löwenstrasse station, were opened. Whilst the other works are still outstanding and expected to be completed in 2015, the partial completion resulted in significant changes to the Zürich S-Bahn.

These changes included the diversion of lines S2, S8 and S14 through the Weinberg Tunnel. These lines previously ran via Zürich Wipkingen station, and in order to prevent that station losing service, S24 was extended from Zürich Hauptbahnhof station via Wipkingen to Zürich Oerlikon station. At the same time, the former Glarner Sprinter, a two-hourly train service from Zürich Hauptbahnhof to Linthal, was replaced with a new hourly S-Bahn service, the S25. These major changes resulted in a number of other changes, with service to various stations being provided by different lines.

Operation

Current services 
 32 services comprise the Zürich S-Bahn network. The lines are numbered (2‒21, 23‒26, 29‒30, 33, 35‒36, 40‒42) using the prefix "S", which is typical for S-Bahn systems. With the exception of lines S13, S17, S18, S26, S29, S30, S33, S35, S36, S40, and S41, all routes run through or terminate at Zurich mainstation.

Unless noted otherwise, all services operate every 30 minutes throughout the day and follow a strict, regular timetable. This is known in the German speaking world as a Taktfahrplan, or clock-face scheduling in English. There may be additional trains during peak periods, and a reduced frequency in the evenings and/or at weekends. Timely connecting services often exist at junction stations.

Nighttime services 
During weekends, in the night from Friday to Saturday and from Saturday to Sunday, there are nighttime S-Bahn services (designated SN followed by the route number) and nighttime bus services (designated N followed by the line number). Nighttime services operate from 1 o'clock until the early morning hours. The nighttime S-Bahn and bus routes form a network, which is different from the daytime network. Most SN services run hourly. As of December 2022, the following nighttime S-Bahn services existed:

Previous services 
 The S1 formerly linked Zürich and Zug via Thalwil. It was renamed the S21 after the opening of the S1 line of the Lucerne-Zug network (Zug Stadtbahn and Lucerne S-Bahn) in 2004 to avoid confusion. It is discontinued and replaced with the part of the line S24. 
 The former S11 was a rush hour service. It was subsumed into the S23 in December 2018 when the current S11 service opened.
 The former S12 operated between Brugg and Seuzach/Seen until December 2018.
 The former S21 was subsumed into the S24 after the opening of the Weinberg Tunnel in 2014.
 The S22 formerly linked Bülach with Singen (in Germany) via Schaffhausen. It has been replaced by the S9 and S24 services, respectively, in 2015.
 The S31 used to run across the Seedamm, between Rapperswil and Pfäffikon SZ.
 The S43 ran between Rüti ZH and Wald ZH (near Rapperswil) and had only three stations and was in fact a limited service of S26. It has been replaced by a bus route.
 The S55 formerly linked Niederweningen and Oberglatt, as a short-working of the S5. It has now been replaced by the S15.
 The S3 formerly operated between Wetzikon and Aarau via Dietikon. However its western route is overtaken by the S11, it runs to Hardbrücke (or Bülach) instead.

International services 
Two Zürich S-Bahn services cross the international border into Germany. Service S9 crosses German territory between Rafz and Schaffhausen (both in Switzerland), calling at the German stations of Lottstetten and Jestetten. These two stations are located entirely on German soil, but all the infrastructure belongs to SBB. Service S36 crosses the border at the end of its journey, in order to terminate at Waldshut station in Germany.

Network map

Future developments 
Further improvements are envisaged, including two additional tracks at Oerlikon railway station, a passing loop in Pfäffikon and adjustments at various stations. Further improvements in the corridor between the airport and Winterthur are being developed as part of the second stage of Rail 2000 for long-distance trains, which would require further adjustments for the S-Bahn.

In the longer term, a vision for 2030 named Projekt S-Bahn 2G includes the development of two types of S-Bahn services and trains. Inner services will operate every 15 minutes, and will be provided by single-deck trains, so that passengers can embark and disembark quickly. Outer express services will operate every half-hour, stopping at all stations in the outer area but only at principal stations in the inner area, and will be formed of double-deck stock in order to provide more seating for longer journeys.

In September 2014 a study was published for the construction of a new rail tunnel and underground station serving the ETH Hönggerberg "Science City". The new tunnel would run directly between Hardbrücke and Regensdorf stations, as opposed to the indirect route via the existing Käferberg Tunnel and Oerlikon station that is currently used by service S6.

References

Notes

External links

 

S-Bahn in Switzerland
Regional rail in Switzerland
S-Bahn
 
1990 establishments in Switzerland